Franklin D. Roosevelt High School is a public secondary school in the Oak Cliff area of Dallas, Texas (USA), serving grades 9 - 12. The school opened in 1963 and is part of the Dallas Independent School District.

The school serves several South Dallas communities, including Cadillac Heights and some Oak Cliff neighborhoods.

History
Construction of the school began in 1961 at 525 Bonnie View Road in the Oak Cliff area. Built before the school district integrated its high schools, the campus was the first new "Negro high school" built in Dallas since 1939 at the time it opened in January 1963. The school was built to serve a maximum capacity of 2000 students and at its opening was expected to draw about 1200 students from the Oak Cliff area, most previously attending Madison High School — which had itself been converted to a "Negro school" in 1956 to relieve overcrowding at Booker T. Washington and Lincoln high schools.

The school is named after Franklin Delano Roosevelt, the 32nd U.S. President in honor of him passing and assisting lower class citizens opportunity for growth. School colors chosen were Columbia blue, White, and Cardinal red. Most recent colors used for FDR are navy blue, light blue and white.

In 2005, after the closure of Wilmer-Hutchins High School. Roosevelt absorbed some WHISD high school students.

In 2011 the district re-opened Wilmer Hutchins High. Some former WHISD zones covered by Roosevelt were rezoned to Wilmer-Hutchins.

Notable alumni

See also

 History of the African Americans in Dallas-Fort Worth

References

External links 

 
 Alumni Association

Public high schools in Dallas
Historically segregated African-American schools in Texas
Public high schools in Texas
Monuments and memorials to Franklin D. Roosevelt in the United States